Aïté is a village in the Cercle of Kayes in the Kayes Region of south-western Mali. It is located north of Kayes city.

The village has had problems with drought affecting harvests.

Populated places in Kayes Region